Anke Jannie Landman (born 8 October 1974) is a Dutch short track speed skater. She competed at the 1994 Winter Olympics and the 1998 Winter Olympics.

References

1974 births
Living people
Dutch female short track speed skaters
Olympic short track speed skaters of the Netherlands
Short track speed skaters at the 1994 Winter Olympics
Short track speed skaters at the 1998 Winter Olympics
People from Assen
Sportspeople from Drenthe